Liviu Marius Floricel (born 30 July 1987) is a Romanian former footballer who played as a defender for teams such as ROVA Roșiori, Ceahlăul Piatra Neamț, Callatis Mangalia, FCM Alexandria, Sporting Roşiori or Flacăra Moreni, among others. He is currently the manager of Liga IV side Astra Plosca.

External links
 
 
 
 
 

1987 births
Living people
People from Roșiorii de Vede
Romanian footballers
Association football defenders
Liga I players
Liga II players
Liga III players
FC Internațional Curtea de Argeș players
CSM Ceahlăul Piatra Neamț players
FCM Câmpina players
FC Callatis Mangalia players
FC Voluntari players
CSM Flacăra Moreni players
Romanian football managers